The 1994 Anchorage mayoral election was held on May 2 and May 17, 1994, to elect the mayor of Anchorage, Alaska. It saw the election of Rick Mystrom.

Since no candidate had received 40% of the vote in the first round (which at least one candidate was required to obtain to avoid a runoff), a runoff was held between the top-two finishers.

Results

First round

Runoff

References

See also

Anchorage
Anchorage 
1994
Mark Begich